Huancapi is a town in Central Peru, capital of the province Víctor Fajardo in the region Ayacucho.

Populated places in the Ayacucho Region